Țibleș may refer to the following places in Romania:

 Țibleș (Brad), a tributary of the Brad in Maramureș County 
 Țibleș (Someșul Mare), a tributary of the Someșul Mare in Bistrița-Năsăud County, Romania
 Țibleș Mountains, a mountain range in Maramureș County